Not proven is a verdict available to a court of law in Scotland. Under Scots law, a criminal trial may end in one of three verdicts, one of conviction ("guilty") and two of acquittal ("not proven" and "not guilty").

Between the Restoration in the late 17th century and the early 18th century, jurors in Scotland were expected only to find whether individual factual allegations were proven or not proven, rather than to rule on an accused's guilt. In 1728, the jury in a murder trial asserted "its ancient right" to declare a defendant "not guilty". Over time, the "not guilty" verdict regained wide acceptance and use amongst Scots juries, with the encouragement of defence lawyers. It eventually displaced "not proven" as the primary verdict of acquittal. Nowadays, juries can return a verdict of either "not guilty" or "not proven", with the same legal effect of acquittal.

Although historically it may be a similar verdict to not guilty, in the present day not proven is typically used by a jury when there is a belief that the defendant is guilty but The Crown has not provided sufficient evidence. Scots law requires corroboration; the evidence of one witness, however credible, is not sufficient to prove a charge against an accused or to establish any material or crucial fact.

In Scotland, there have been attempts to abolish what Sir Walter Scott famously called that bastard verdict. In 1827, Scott, who was sheriff in the court of Selkirk, wrote in his journal that "the jury gave that bastard verdict, Not proven.

History
By the early 17th century, the standard practice of juries in Scotland was to return a finding of "fylet, culpable and convict" or "clene, innocent and acquit". This changed in the late 17th century, at which point the role of the jury became simply to "declare whether or not the facts alleged had been proved", with the judge left to determine, based on that declaration, whether the accused was guilty or not.

There is some disagreement between historians as to why this change happened. David Hume and Hugo Arnot argue that it was rooted in religious oppression. The Crown persecuted the Covenanters but popular support made it impossible to convict them in a jury trial. To pare the power of the jury, the Scottish judges began restricting the jury's role: no longer would the jury announce whether the accused was "guilty" or "not guilty"; instead it would decide whether specific factual allegations were "proven" or "not proven"; and the judge would then decide whether to convict.

Reintroduction of "not guilty"
In 1728, in the trial of Carnegie of Finhaven for the murder of the Earl of Strathmore, the defence lawyer (Robert Dundas) persuaded a jury to reassert its ancient right of acquitting, of finding an accused "not guilty", in spite of the facts being proven. The law required the jury merely to look at the facts and pass a verdict of "proven" or "not proven" depending on whether they believed the evidence proved that the accused had killed the Earl. Carnegie had undoubtedly killed the Earl, but had also clearly not intended to do so. If the jury brought in a "proven" verdict they would in effect constrain the judge to find Carnegie guilty of murder, for which the punishment was hanging. To avert this outcome, the jury asserted what it believed to be their "ancient right" to judge the whole case and not just the facts, and brought in the verdict of "not guilty".

The reintroduction of the "not guilty" verdict was part of a wider movement during the 17th and 18th century which saw a gradual increase in the power of juries, such as the trial of William Penn in 1670, in which an English jury first gained the right to pass a verdict contrary to the law (known as jury nullification), and the trial of John Peter Zenger in New York in 1735 in which jury nullification is credited with establishing freedom of the press as a firm right in what became the United States. Legal academic Ian Willock argues that the 1728 case was "of great significance in calling a halt to a process of attrition which might have led to the total extinction of the criminal jury".

Although jurors continued to use both "not guilty" and "not proven" after 1728, jurors tended to favour the "not guilty" verdict over the "not proven" and the interpretation changed.

Calls for reform
There have been repeated calls to abolish the "not proven" verdict since the middle of the 20th century. In 1975, the Thomson Committee on Criminal Procedure in Scotland (chaired by Lord Thomson) recommended retaining the three-verdict system. The Scottish Office consulted on removing "not proven" in 1994. Unsuccessful attempts to scrap the "not proven" verdict were made in Parliament by Donald Dewar in 1969, George Robertson in 1993 (prompted by the trial outcome in the murder of Amanda Duffy) and Lord Macauly of Bragar in 1995. A members' bill to abolish the "not proven" verdict was debated in the Scottish Parliament in 2016, but was rejected by 80 votes to 28.

Proponents of reform argue that the "not proven" verdict is widely regarded as an acquittal used when the judge or jury does not have enough evidence to convict but is not sufficiently convinced of the accused person's innocence to bring in a "not guilty" verdict. Essentially, the judge or jury is unconvinced that the suspect is innocent, but guilt has not been proven "beyond reasonable doubt". Conversely, its opponents argue that a two-verdict system would lead to an increase in wrongful convictions.

Following a not proven verdict in a criminal trial in 2015, Miss M successfully sued Stephen Coxen in the civil courts, in what was the first civil damages action for rape following an unsuccessful criminal prosecution in almost 100 years. In 2018 Miss M launched #EndNotProven alongside Rape Crisis Scotland, calling for Not Proven to be removed and citing the disproportionate use in rape cases, the widespread misunderstandings of the verdict and fears that it is being used as an 'easy way out' by jurors.

Modern usage
In Scotland, a criminal case may be decided either in solemn procedure by a jury (instructed by the judge), or in summary procedure by the judge alone (with no jury appointed). There are various rules for when the one or the other procedure may or must be employed; in general, juries are employed for the more severe accusations, while petty crimes and offences are treated summarily. A criminal case jury consists of fifteen jurors, who make their decision by a simple majority vote: eight votes are necessary and sufficient for the verdict guilty, which has replaced the verdict proven.

Approximately one-third of all acquittal verdicts by Scottish juries use the formulation not proven; the others use not guilty. The verdict not proven also is available for judges in the summary procedure, and is employed in about a fifth of such acquittals. The proportion of not proven acquittals, in general, is higher in the more severe cases; but so then are the proportion of acquittals versus convictions. This might have many different reasons, for example that on average it might be more difficult to establish guilt beyond a reasonable doubt in the more severe cases.

Not proven is sometimes interpreted as indicating that the jury or judge is not convinced of the innocence of the accused; in fact, they may be convinced that the accused is guilty, but do not find the evidence sufficient for a conviction.

Use in other jurisdictions

In general, the Scottish verdict has not been permanently adopted outside its home country, but it was sometimes used in colonial Canada, especially by some judges in southwestern Ontario. Its most famous use in the United States came when Senator Arlen Specter tried to vote "not proven" on the two articles of impeachment of Bill Clinton, his votes were recorded as "not guilty" and when, at the O. J. Simpson murder case, various reformers, including Fred Goldman, Ron Goldman's father, pushed for a change to "not proven" because of what they felt was an incorrect presumption of innocence on the part of Simpson. The verdict is often referenced in US cases where the jury is obliged to find the state has not proved its case beyond a reasonable doubt, but there is widespread feeling that the defendant does not deserve the exoneration of a "not guilty" verdict. A popular saying about the "not proven" verdict is that it means "not guilty, but don't do it again".

In 2005, a proposal was made in the University of Chicago Law Review to introduce the not proven verdict into the United States.

Notable cases which resulted in a not proven verdict
Sir Hugh Campbell and Sir George Campbell for being part of the rising at Bothwell Bridge
Alfred John Monson, in relation to the Ardlamont murder
Madeleine Smith, accused of murdering her boyfriend by poison
Helen McDougal, in relation to the Burke and Hare murders
Alan Peters, in relation to the murder of Maxwell Garvie
Donald Merrett, tried in February 1927 for the murder of his mother
John Leslie, in relation to an alleged sexual assault
Francis Auld, accused of the murder of Amanda Duffy
 Stephen Coxen, tried for raping Miss M. in 2015. In 2018 a civil case ruled that he had raped her
 Alex Salmond, on a single charge of 14, following the criminal prosecution brought against him

See also
Jury nullification
Miscarriage of justice

References

Further reading

 The Scottish criminal jury: A very peculiar institution, Peter Duff, 62 Law & Contemp. Probs. 173 (Spring 1999)
 
 

Scots language
Scottish criminal law
Scots law legal terminology
High Court of Justiciary